

Results
Arsenal's score comes first

https://www.11v11.com/teams/arsenal/tab/matches/season/1942/

Legend

London War League

Selected results from the league.

Final league table

London War Cup

References

External links
 Arsenal season-by-season line-ups

1941-42
English football clubs 1941–42 season